Kalem Company was a former film studio in the United States.

Kalem may also refer to:

 Kalem (magazine), a satirical magazine published in the period 1908–1911 in Istanbul, Ottoman Empire
 Kalem (surname)
 Kalem Island, an Aegean island of Turkey
 Kalem, Mississippi
 Kalem Club, an informal New York City literary and intellectual group with H.P. Lovecraft
 Kalem railway station, a small railway station in Goa, India